Arthur Russell Colpitts (September 7, 1906 – February 11, 1976) was a farmer and political figure in New Brunswick, Canada. He represented Albert in the Legislative Assembly of New Brunswick as a Liberal member from 1939 to 1952.

He was born in Colpitts Settlement, New Brunswick, the son of Samuel B. Colpitts and Addie B. In 1927, he married Geraldine A. Fulton. Colpitts was also a fox rancher.

References 

 Canadian Parliamentary Guide, 1940, AL Normandin

1906 births
1976 deaths
20th-century Canadian legislators
New Brunswick Liberal Association MLAs
People from Albert County, New Brunswick